The Lame Gentleman (Russian: Хромой барин) is a 1929 Soviet silent film directed by Konstantin Eggert.

The film's art direction was by Vladimir Yegorov.

Cast
 Mikhail Klimov as Volkov 
 Nikolai Aleksandrov 
 L. Cherkes 
 Konstantin Eggert 
 Lev Fenin 
 Boris Gorin-Goryainov
 Georgi Kovrov 
 O. Lenskaya 
 Yelena Maksimova
 Vera Malinovskaya 
 F. Trubetskoy 
 Vladimir Vladislavskiy 
 Daniil Vvedenskiy
 Konstantin Zubov

References

Bibliography 
 Christie, Ian & Taylor, Richard. The Film Factory: Russian and Soviet Cinema in Documents 1896-1939. Routledge, 2012.

External links 
 

1929 films
Soviet silent feature films
1920s Russian-language films
Films directed by Konstantin Eggert
Soviet black-and-white films